The following is a list of schools of the Roman Catholic Archdiocese of Newark.

K-12 schools
 Essex County
 Lacordaire Academy (Upper Montclair)
 St. Benedict's Preparatory School (Newark)
 Union County
 Oak Knoll School of the Holy Child (Summit)

7-12 schools
 Hudson County
 St. Dominic Academy (Jersey City)
 Union County
 Oratory Preparatory School (Summit)

High schools
Bergen County

 Academy of the Holy Angels (Demarest)
 Bergen Catholic High School (Oradell)
 Don Bosco Preparatory High School (Ramsey)
 Immaculate Conception High School (Lodi)
 Immaculate Heart Academy (Washington Township)
 Paramus Catholic High School (Paramus)
 St. Joseph Regional High School (Montvale)
 St. Mary High School (Rutherford)

Essex County
 Immaculate Conception High School (Montclair)
 Mount Saint Dominic Academy (Caldwell)
 St. Vincent Academy (Newark)
 Seton Hall Preparatory School (West Orange)

Hudson County
 Hudson Catholic Regional High School (Jersey City)
 St. Peter's Preparatory School (Jersey City)
 Kenmare High School* (Jersey City)
 * Alternative school financially independent of archdiocese.

Union County
 Mother Seton Regional High School (Clark)
 Roselle Catholic High School (Roselle)
 Union Catholic Regional High School (Scotch Plains)

K-8 schools

Bergen County
Edited by Angelo Ruscitto (CCS Class of 2022)
 The Academy at Saint Mary (Rutherford)
 Academy of the Most Blessed Sacrament (Franklin Lakes)
 Academy of Our Lady (Glen Rock)
 Academy of Our Lady of Mount Carmel (Tenafly)
 Academy of Our Lady of Grace (Fairview)
 Academy of St Paul (Interparochial) (Ramsey)
 Christ the Teacher School (Interparochial) (Fort Lee)
 The churches sponsoring the school are: Holy Trinity and Madonna in Fort Lee, Epiphany in Cliffside Park, and Holy Rosary in Edgewater. It occupies the former facility of the Madonna Catholic School. Epiphany joined after Epiphany School merged into Christ the Teacher in 2005.
 Corpus Christi School (PreK-8) (Hasbrouck Heights)
 Notre Dame Academy (Interparochial) (Palisades Park)
 Our Lady of Mercy Academy (Interparochial) (Park Ridge)
 Queen of Peace School (North Arlington)
 Sacred Heart School (Lyndhurst)
 St. Elizabeth School (Wyckoff)
 St. John Academy (Interparochial) (Hillsdale)
 St. Joseph Academy (Bogota)
 St. Joseph School (Oradell)
 St. Leo's School (Elmwood Park)
 St. Peter Academy (River Edge)
 Transfiguration Academy (Bergenfield)
 Visitation Academy (Paramus)

Essex County
 Newark
 Ironbound Catholic Academy
 It is on the site of the former St. Casimir Catholic School. It was formed by the merger of St. Casimir, Academy of St. Benedict, and St. Lucy Filippini Academy.
 St. Francis Xavier School
 St. Michael School
 Other municipalities
 Aquinas Academy (Livingston)
 Good Shepherd Academy (Nutley)
 Our Lady of the Lake School (Verona)
 Our Lady of Sorrows School (South Orange)
 St. Catherine of Siena School (Cedar Grove)
 St. Joseph School (East Orange)
 St. Peter School (Belleville)
 St. Rose of Lima Academy (Short Hills)
 St. Thomas the Apostle School (Bloomfield)
 St. Cassian School  (Upper Montclair)

Hudson County
 Jersey City
 Our Lady of Czestochowa School, also known as the OLC School, had about 480 students in 2017. It opened a second campus for grades 3–8 in the Boys & Girls Club of Hudson County building in 2018 to accommodate additional students, as its enrollment was 540 in August 2018. The Great Futures Charter High School, which previously operated out of the Boys & Girls Club building, dissolved earlier that year, allowing OLC to take space in the building.
 Sacred Heart School
 St. Aloysius Elementary Academy
 St. Joseph School
 St. Nicholas School
 Union City
 Mother Seton School
 St. Augustine School
 St. Francis Academy
 Other municipalities
 Academy of St. Joseph of the Palisades (West New York)
 All Saints Catholic Academy (Bayonne) - It was a merger of four Catholic schools and was established on July 1, 2008 in the ex-Saint Mary, Star of the Sea site. The building was repurposed to house a consolidated student body, with a preschool room designated from the former kindergarten facility. It was to house students associated with the eight Catholic churches in the municipality, and the archdiocese classified it as a "Deanery school". The school opened on September 3, 2008. At the time of opening over 500 students attended, with about 450 in grades Kindergarten through 8 and the remainder in preschool. At the time it had 22 teachers, five teaching aides,  and three other employees. The predecessor schools in early 2008 had a combined total of 750-800 students.
The Roman Catholic Archdiocese of Newark announced in September 2007 that it would combine Bayonne's four remaining Catholic elementary schools — Our Lady of Mt. Carmel (Bayonne, New Jersey), Saint Andrew, Saint Vincent and Saint Mary, Star of the Sea — into a single school in response to 10 years of declining enrollments in the schools. Sister Eileen Jude Wust was selected to serve as the school's principal. In 2017 ASCA was recognized as a National Blue Ribbon School.
 Hoboken Catholic Academy (Hoboken)
 Its students are in Hoboken and Weehawken. A consolidation of existing Catholic schools, it was formerly co-sponsored by four Hoboken churches, Our Lady of Grace, St. Ann, St. Francis, and Sts. Peter and Paul, along with St. Lawrence Church in Hoboken, before the archdiocese's Lighting the Way program changed the allocation of money for schools in the archdiocese.

Union County
 The Academy of Our Lady of Peace (New Providence) - The school was once a winner of the National Blue Ribbon Award. The archdiocese spent, each year, $277,000 to fund the school. In 2020 the archdiocese announced it would close in the wake of the COVID-19 pandemic. In response members of the school community started a fundraising drive to try to get it to reopen, and the archdiocese announced it would reopen, with the congregation taking financial control.
 Holy Trinity School (Westfield)
 Koinonia Academy (Plainfield)
 Oak Knoll School of the Holy Child Lower School (Summit) (private school not directly operated by the archdiocese)
 Our Lady of Guadalupe Academy (Elizabeth)
 St. Bartholomew Academy (Scotch Plains)
 St. John the Apostle School (Clark)
 St. Joseph the Carpenter School (Roselle)
 St. Michael School (Cranford)
 St. Michael School (Union)
 St. Theresa School (Kenilworth)
 St. Teresa of Avila School (Summit)

Early childhood centers
 Assumption Early Childhood Center (Emerson) - Formerly Assumption Academy, it was a full PK-8 school. In 2008 it had 171 students in its K-8 program. This decreased to 157 in 2011 and 137 in 2012. The 1-8 grades closed in 2012 and it became only a preschool and kindergarten.

Former schools
The archdiocese closed nine schools in the period from 1989 to 1995. From 1999 to 2014 the student body decreased to only 60% of the initial total. In 2005 seven schools consolidated and/or closed.

From 1998 to 2008 the archdiocese closed about 25% of its schools. Three more schools were shuttered and an additional seven merged in 2009. In 2010 and 2012 it closed six elementary schools each. In addition, in the latter year, one high school was closed and one PK-8 school became preschool/kindergarten only. The 2012 closures were influenced by the schools taking funds from their congregations while their enrollment numbers declined. In 2014 the archdiocese four elementary schools, with one in each of its counties; after those closures it had 70 elementary schools remaining. In 2020 it closed one high school and nine K-8 schools due to a decrease in enrollments.

Circa 2008 the archdiocese considered 225 to be the minimal optimal enrollment for a K-8 school.

Former high schools
 Bergen County
 Queen of Peace High School (North Arlington; closed 2017)

 Essex County
Christ the King Preparatory School, later Cristo Rey Newark High School (Newark) (Closed 2020)
Essex Catholic High School (East Orange; closed 2003)
Marylawn of the Oranges High School (South Orange)
Our Lady of Good Counsel High School (Newark; closed 2006)

 Hudson County
 Academy of St. Aloysius (Jersey City; closed 2006)
 Academy of the Sacred Heart (Hoboken)
 Caritas Academy (Jersey City; closed 2008)
 Holy Family Academy (Bayonne)  (CLOSED)
 Marist High School (Bayonne; closed 2020)
 St. Aloysius High School (Jersey City, closed 2007)
 St. Anthony High School (Jersey City) -- closed 2017
 St. Joseph of the Palisades High School (West New York)
 St. Mary High School (Jersey City)

 Union County
 Benedictine Academy (Elizabeth) (closed 2020)
 St. Mary of the Assumption High School (Elizabeth) (closed 2019)
 St. Patrick High School (Elizabeth) (site is now occupied by The Patrick School)

Former K-8 schools

Bergen County (former)
Schools include:
 Academy of Saint Therese of Lisieux, formerly St. Therese School (Cresskill) - Closed 2020
 Ascension School (New Milford)
 Epiphany School (Cliffside Park) - Merged into Christ the Teacher School in 2005.
 Garfield Catholic Academy (Garfield)
 Holy Family Interparochial School (Norwood)
 Holy Trinity School (Hackensack)
 Most Sacred Heart of Jesus School (Wallington) - It closed in 2014. Circa 2004-2014 the archdiocese spent more than $3 million to keep the school in operation.
 Mother Cabrini Interparochial School (Lodi)
 Notre Dame Interparochial Primary School (Ridgefield)
 Our Lady of the Assumption School (Wood-Ridge) - It closed in 2010.
 St. Anne School (Fair Lawn) - Closed 2020
 St. Catharine Interparochial School (Glen Rock)
 St. Cecilia Interparochial School (Englewood)
 St. Elizabeth Seton Interparochial School (Fair Lawn)
 St. Francis School (Hackensack)
 St. Francis of Assisi School (Ridgefield Park) - It closed in 2010.
 St. John School (Leonia)
 St. John the Evangelist School (Bergenfield)
 St. Joseph School (East Rutherford) - It closed in 2010.
 St. Joseph/Sacred Heart School (Demarest)
 St. Mary School (Closter)
 St. Mary School (Dumont)
 St. Michael School (Lyndhurst)
 St. Philip the Apostle School (Saddle Brook)
 St. Thomas More Interparochial School (Midland Park)

Essex County (former)
Schools include:
Newark
 Academy of St. Benedict - It had 250 students in 2004. Merged into Ironbound Catholic Academy in 2005.
 Blessed Sacrament School - It was located in the South Ward. It opened circa 1916, and historically each class had around 40 students. Mary Jo Patterson of The New York Times described it as one of two schools with "proud histories and fiercely loyal adherents." Paterson stated its building was "hopelessly obsolete, with a history of few renovations." In 2005 it had 159 students. Enrollment declined after, the following year, the church made the tuition $2,900 per year and also required each parent to raise $400. Enrollment declined even more when, in 2008, parents were now obligated to raise $900 each and tuition was raised higher, to over $3,000. In December 2007 enrollment was down to 97, and this went down further to 95 by April 2008, with fewer than 10 were Catholic; the number of students who also attend the school's parish was below 10. In December 2017 Rev. Anselm I. Nwaorgu, the pastor of Blessed Sacrament, cited the low enrollment and asked the Newark Archdiocese to allow him to close Blessed Sacrament School. The school was to close in June of that year. A charter school was scheduled to occupy its space; charter schools had been asking the church for information on its school space prior to the closure. Former Academic director Alice Terrell stated that the drop in enrollment and closure resulted from an increase in charter schools.
 Our Lady of Good Counsel School - Closed in 2005.
 Queen of Angels School - It was in the Central Ward and belonged to a church, established in 1930, that was the city's first church catering to African-Americans. Its building dated from 1887, and Patterson described its school building, connected to the worship building, as "a confusing warren of rooms" and "hopelessly obsolete, with a history of few renovations." Patterson described the institution as one of two schools with "proud histories and fiercely loyal adherents." In 2008 it had about 200 students, with fewer than 20 were Catholic, and the number of students who also attend the school's parish was below 20. Due to the number of students enrolled, Patterson stated at the time it was "not in danger" of closing. In 2008 each parent was asked to raise $300 at fundraisers and the annual tuition was $2,900. It closed in 2012.
 Sacred Heart School
 St. Casimir Academy - It had 220 students in 2004. It merged into Ironbound Catholic Academy in 2005, with the new school occupying the former St. Casimir.
 St. Columba School
 St. John the Baptist School
 St. Lucy School
 St. Lucy Filippini Academy - Merged into Ironbound Catholic Academy in 2005.
 St. Mary School
 St. Rocco School
 St. Rose of Lima School
Bloomfield
 Sacred Heart School
 St. Thomas the Apostle School
Irvington
 Good Shepherd Academy - Closed 2020
 Sacred Heart of Jesus School - Merged into St. Leo/Sacred Heart Interparochial School.
 St. Leo School - Merged into St. Leo/Sacred Heart Interparochial School.
 St. Leo-Sacred Heart Interparochial School - Merger of St. Leo and Sacred Heart schools, closed in 2012.
 St. Paul the Apostle School
Maplewood
 Immaculate Heart of Mary School
 St. Joseph School - It opened circa 1930. Circa 2003 it had 310 students; by 2010 the enrollment was down to 165. The archdiocese initially announced it proposed closing the school that year, parents started a campaign to keep the school open; the archdiocese replied by stating that as long as prospective enrollment went up to 210, the school could continue, but by June 2010 the projected enrollment was only 140, with the number having formally registered and whose parents/guardians had paid tuition expenses being 102. It closed in 2010.
Orange
 Our Lady of Mt. Carmel School
 St. John School - It closed in 2012.
West Orange
 Blessed Pope John XXIII Academy - Closed in 2014.
 Our Lady of Lourdes School
 St. Joseph School
Other municipalities
 Our Lady Help of Christians School (East Orange) - Closed 2020
 Trinity Academy (Caldwell) - Closed 2020

Hudson County (former)
Schools include:
Jersey City
 Assumption/All Saints School - Merged into St. Patrick's School in 2005.
 Holy Rosary School
 Our Lady of Mt. Carmel School 
 Our Lady of Mercy School 
 Our Lady of Victories School
 St. Aedan School 
 St. Anne School - It was located in Jersey City Heights, and opened in 1904. Its enrollment declined by 33 in 2011 and increased by 22 in 2012. James Carroll, a member of the Jersey City Police Department and a member of the school board, Carroll stated that the 2011 decline was due to parents being afraid that the school would close. In 2011 the archdiocese considered closing the school, but a fundraising generated sufficient money to keep it open. It closed in 2012. That year the building housed the K-8 grades of the Hoboken Charter School on a temporary basis as the regular K-8 building of the charter school had a fire.
 St. Bridget School 
 SS. John & Ann Interparochial School
 St. Mary School
 St. Paul School
 St. Paul of the Cross School
 St. Peter School
 St. Patrick School
Bayonne
 Our Lady of Mt. Carmel School
 Our Lady of the Assumption School
 St. Andrew School
 St. Mary, Star of the Sea School - In 2007 it had 184 students. The following year it merged into All Saints Catholic Academy.
 St. Vincent de Paul School
Hoboken
 John Paul II Interparochial School
 Our Lady of Grace School
 SS. Peter & Paul School
Kearney
 Mater Dei Academy - It opened in 2009 as a merger of St. Stephen School and Holy Cross School. Its initial enrollment was 250, but this declined to 170 for the 2011–2012 school year; the school closed in 2012. 
 Sacred Heart School
 St. Cecilia School
 St. Stephen School - Merged into Mater Dei Academy in 2009
Union City
 Holy Rosary Academy
 Mother Seton Parochial - Merged into Mother Seton Interparochial School in 2005.
 St. Anthony School - Merged into Mother Seton Interparochial School in 2005.
Other municipalities
 Holy Cross School (Harrison) - Merged into Mater Dei Academy in Kearney in 2009.
 Immaculate Conception School (Secaucus)
 Our Lady of Libera School (West New York) - It closed in 2010.
 St. John Nepomucene School (North Bergen)

Union County (former)
Schools include:
 Elizabeth
 Bender Memorial Academy - It was a private school not directly operated by the archdiocese. It closed in 2005.
 Blessed Sacrament School - Its neighborhood was historically Irish American.
 Elizabethport Catholic School - It formed in 1996, from a merger St. Adelbert's, St. Peter and St. Paul, and St. Patrick's. The school was to use all three buildings, with Peter and Paul having preschool, St. Adelbert housing grades 1–4, and St. Patrick for grades 5–8. By 1998 the St. Patrick building served as the upper school, another building was used as a lower school, and a separate building was used for the office of its director. Elizabethport Catholic's initial projected enrollment was 500; the combined enrollment meant that the school could have classes for high-level students, athletic programs, and after school programs, things lacking in the predecessor schools. Its proposed initial annual tuition was $1,500, which some parents believed would be too expensive. Its prospective students, as of the 1990s, were African-American, Hispanic American, and Portuguese American, with over 50% being Catholic.
 Immaculate Conception School
 St. Adelbert Parochial School - The land for the school and church building was dedicated on November 6, 1906. Historically many of the students were Polish American. Circa the 1980s there were what the church's website called "improvements". By the 1990s its students came from other ethnic backgrounds. Enrollment declined after the 1980s. It merged into Elizabethport Catholic, with the merger scheduled for 1996.
 St. Anthony of Padua School - Its neighborhood historically was Italian American.
 St. Catherine School - Its neighborhood was historically Irish American.
 St. Genevieve School - It was in the Elmora neighborhood. It closed in 2020.
 St. Hedwig School
 St. Mary of Assumption School
 St. Patrick's Grammar School - It was located in the Elizabethport neighborhood. Historically its students were Irish American. By the 1990s its students came from other ethnic backgrounds. It merged into Elizabethport Catholic, with the merger scheduled for 1996.
 Sts. Peter and Paul School - Historically many of the students were Lithuanian American. By the 1990s its students came from other ethnic backgrounds. It merged into Elizabethport Catholic, with the merger scheduled for 1996.
 Hillside
 Christ the King School
 Hillside Catholic Academy - A merger of Catholic schools, it opened in 2006 with 256 students. In 2011 it had 165 students, and this went down to 156 in 2012. It was scheduled to close in 2012 even though the home and school association lobbied to keep it open.
 Linden
 St. Elizabeth of Hungary School
 Saints Mary and Elizabeth Academy - Closed in 2014.
 St. Theresa School
 Other municipalities
 Holy Spirit School (Union) - Closed 2020
 St. Agnes School (Clark) - Closed in 2014.
 St. James the Apostle School (Springfield) - Closed 2020
 St. Mary School (Rahway)

References

Further reading

External links
 Catholic Schools in the Archdiocese of Newark

Newark
Education in Jersey City, New Jersey
Education in Newark, New Jersey
Schools